Aara is an Indian actress who has appeared in Tamil films. She has starred in films such as  Paisa (2016) and One Way (2022).

Career
Aara is the daughter of noted Tamil film press relations officer Durai Pandi. After playing supporting roles in Jeeva (2014) and Poojai (2014), she portrayed her first lead role in Paisa (2016), portraying a girl who works in a supermarket. She subsequently worked on Guru Uchaththula Irukkaru (2017), which also had a low-key opening.

She had two releases in 2022, the long-delayed Kuzhali, where she had replaced Esther Anil in a lead role, and One Way, where she featured alongside Kovai Sarala.

Filmography

References

External links 
 

Indian film actresses
Tamil actresses
Living people
Actresses in Tamil cinema
21st-century Indian actresses
Year of birth missing (living people)